Ankit Yadav (born 19 November 1993) is an Indian cricketer. He made his List A debut for Odisha in the 2012–13 Vijay Hazare Trophy on 18 February 2013. He made his first-class debut on 12 February 2020, for Odisha in the 2019–20 Ranji Trophy.

References

External links
 

1993 births
Living people
Indian cricketers
Railways cricketers
Odisha cricketers
People from Jharsuguda district
Cricketers from Odisha